Mandarin Oriental, Singapore is a luxury hotel located in Marina Centre next to Marina Square Shopping Mall and near Suntec City, home to one of Asia Pacific's largest convention centres – the Suntec Singapore International Convention and Exhibition Centre, and the city's financial district.The hotel includes 527 rooms and suites, 6 restaurants and bars, and a Spa at Mandarin Oriental, Singapore.

Overview

Mandarin Oriental is located in Marina Centre, Singapore. Originally built in 1987, the Mandarin Oriental, Singapore underwent a significant renovation in 2004 to update the hotel's interiors. In both 2010 and 2011, Mandarin Oriental, Singapore was named in Condé Nast Traveler's Gold List.

The hotel's 527 rooms and suites overlook the Singapore city skyline. US Architect John Portman designed the atrium-style hotel based on a theatre concept and intended the exterior of the structure to resemble a fan, a nod to the Mandarin Oriental logo.

The hotel houses six restaurants, as well as a bar and a private lounge. The Oriental Club is the largest hotel lounge in Singapore.

Gallery

See also
Mandarin Oriental Hotel Group

External links
 Mandarin Oriental, Singapore

References

Mandarin Oriental Hotel Group
Marina Bay, Singapore
Skyscraper hotels in Singapore
John C. Portman Jr. buildings
Buildings and structures completed in 1987
Hotels established in 1987
Hotel buildings completed in 1987
Downtown Core (Singapore)
Marina Centre
Singaporean companies established in 1987
20th-century architecture in Singapore